Fulgham is a surname. Notable people with the surname include:

Alonzo Fulgham, former Acting Administrator of the United States Agency for International Development (USAID)
George T. Fulgham, Sheriff of San Bernardino County, California from 1864–1866
John Fulgham (born 1956), American baseball player
Travis Fulgham (born 1995), American football player

See also
Fulgham Ridge, a narrow ice-free ridge in the Queen Maud Mountains, Antarctica

See also
Fulham (disambiguation)